Darren Davies (born 14 October 1965) is a former Australian rules footballer who played with Footscray and St Kilda in the Australian Football League (AFL).

Davies began his senior football career in the NTFA playing with Launceston in that team's beaten Grand Final side of 1984. By 1986 he had moved to the TFL competition where he won the best and fairest award at North Hobart and was a member of their premiership side the following year.

After his strong performances for North Hobart, Davies was picked up by Footscray in the 1987 VFL Draft, with pick seven. He missed just one game for the club in 1988, his debut season, in which he had 343 disposals and kicked 21 goals.  Most of his football was played at half forward or on a wing. He finished his career at St Kilda, after being selected by the club in the 1991 Pre-Season Draft.

References

1965 births
Living people
Australian rules footballers from Tasmania
Western Bulldogs players
St Kilda Football Club players
Launceston Football Club players
North Hobart Football Club players
Tasmanian State of Origin players